Timothy Law Snyder is an American educator, mathematician, academic administrator, and musician. He serves as the 16th president of Loyola Marymount University in Los Angeles, California.

Snyder is well known for his academic research, publications and speeches on computational mathematics, data structures, combinatorial optimization, geometric probability, computer music, HIV diagnosis and prevention, and airline flight safety.

Early life
Timothy Law Snyder was born in Ohio. He graduated from the University of Toledo, where he earned a bachelor of arts in psychology and a bachelor of science in mathematics in 1981, followed by a master of science degree in mathematics in 1983. He then earned a master of arts degree in 1985 and a Ph.D. in 1987 in applied and computational mathematics from Princeton University, under the supervision of J. Michael Steele.

Career
Snyder's higher education career began as a graduate student and teacher at the University of Toledo in the Department of Mathematics from 1981 to 1983. From 1984 to 1987, Snyder taught in the Program in Statistics and Operations research at Princeton University, then he taught in the Department of Civil Engineering during the 1986–1987 school year.
 
Snyder began teaching at Georgetown University in Washington, D.C. in 1987 as an assistant professor of computer science. He served as adjunct associate dean for science education in the College of Arts and Sciences from 1993 to 1995. He was chair of Georgetown’s Department of Computer Science from 1994 to 1995, and from 1995 to 1999 he was the first dean of science at Georgetown University. Snyder was the Wright Family Distinguished Professor in the Department of Computer Science from 1997 to 2001. His mathematical research has concerned problems in computational geometry, including Steiner trees, convex hulls, and worst-case analysis of total length and individual lengths geometric graphs.

He was a visiting professor at the Wharton School of the University of Pennsylvania, in the summer of 1991 and 1992.

From 2001 to 2007, Snyder served as the dean of the College of Arts and Sciences at Fairfield University in Fairfield, Connecticut. He was Professor of Mathematics and Vice President for Academic Affairs at Loyola University Maryland from 2007 to 2014. In 2011, Snyder investigated allegations that Professor Thomas DiLorenzo was a member of the League of the South, a neo-Confederate organization.

He has spoken nationwide about the millennial generation and ways to educate them. He has practiced “” for more than 20 years and created LCAST, a series of podcasts aimed at helping students. The podcasts also feature original music he has written, arranged, recorded, produced, mixed, and mastered; his music can also be found on iTunes and on Soundcloud, under his full name.

In 2014, he taught “Concepts of Mathematics (Math for Musicians)” at the Berklee College of Music., as a visiting scholar in the Department of Liberal Arts and the Department of Electronic Production & Design.

Snyder was chosen to replace David W. Burcham as the president of Loyola Marymount University in March 2015. He assumed office as LMU's president on June 1, 2015, and was inaugurated on October 6, 2015.

Personal life
Snyder was born in 1959 to Shirley and Gordon Snyder in Toledo, Ohio. He attended local public schools, including Rogers High School. Snyder is a convert to Roman Catholicism. He has an older sister, Linda Snyder, and a younger brother, Scott Snyder.

He has been a musician most of his life, and was the lead singer in the touring rock and punk band Whirlwind from 1976 to 1983.

Snyder is married to CNN journalist Carol Costello. They met when she interviewed him for a story on the odds of winning the Powerball lottery. They married in 2004.

References

External links
Google scholar profile

Living people
People from Toledo, Ohio
University of Toledo alumni
Princeton University alumni
Georgetown University faculty
Fairfield University faculty
Loyola University Maryland faculty
Loyola Marymount University faculty
20th-century American mathematicians
Researchers in geometric algorithms
1959 births
21st-century American mathematicians